Damned in Venice  (literally "Venetian Black") is an Italian horror film directed in 1978 by Ugo Liberatore.

Plot 
Mark is a nice, young, blond teenage boy, who's blind and, as of recently, is suffering from disturbing visions. He lives with his cold, beautiful, older, blonde sister Christine and their strict, religious grandmother. When the grandmother dies in a freak accident caused accidentally by Mark, he and Christine go to live in a rundown hotel in Venice owned by their sickly aunt and depressed uncle. When the aunt dies, the uncle kills himself and the kids are left to their own devices. Christine takes charge and turns the place into a successful brothel. Then she suddenly becomes pregnant even though she's supposedly still a virgin. She also becomes meaner and meaner to the point of sadism towards Mark. Mark fears that all this has something to do with a disturbing vision he had about the birth of the Antichrist. Mark finds an ally in Giorgio, an artist and Christine's ex-boyfriend. They try to find out more about the mysterious hotel guest who calls himself Dan and who might be the father of Christine's child. Meanwhile, a local catholic priest, Father Stefani, becomes interested in Christine. Can Mark stop the Apocalypse or is he just an unwitting pawn in the devil's endgame?

Cast 
Renato Cestiè : Mark
Rena Niehaus : Christine
Yorgo Voyagis : Dan
Fabio Gamma : Giorgio
José Quaglio : Father Stefani
Olga Karlatos : Madeleine Winters
Lorraine De Selle : Christine's Friend
Ely Galleani : Christine's Friend
Angela Covello : Christine's Friend
Florence Barnes : Christine's Friend
Bettine Milne : Grandmother
Tom Felleghy : Martin Winters

See also     
 List of Italian films of 1978

References

External links

1978 films
Italian horror films
1978 horror films
Films set in Venice
Films scored by Pino Donaggio
1970s Italian-language films
1970s Italian films